Hodoș may refer to several places in Romania:
 Hodoș, a village in Sălard Commune, Bihor County
 Hodoș, a village in Brestovăț Commune, Timiș County
 Hodoș, a village in Darova Commune, Timiș County
 Hodoș, a tributary of the Chizdia in Timiș County
 Hodoș (Târnava Mare), a tributary of the Târnava Mare in Harghita County
 Hodoșa (river), a tributary of the Niraj in Mureș County

See also 
 Hodoș (surname)